Lists of places in Maine may be found:

 List of municipalities in Maine - cities, towns, plantations
 List of unorganized territories in Maine
 List of counties in Maine
 American Indian reservations:
Houlton Band of Maliseet Indians
Mi'kmaq Nation
Passamaquoddy Indian Township Reservation
Passamaquoddy Pleasant Point Reservation
Penobscot Nation

References

Geography of Maine
Places
Maine